Fleg or FLEG may refer to

 Edmond Fleg, a Jewish French writer and intellectual
 Belfast City Hall flag protests, derived from the pronunciation of “flag” in a strong Belfast accent. 
 Fédération Libanaise des Eclaireuses et des Guides, also known by the acronym FLEG
 Forest Law Enforcement and Governance Program (FLEG), a forest management program